Sivry-Ante is a commune in the Marne département in north-eastern France. The commune was formed from the combination of two former communes, Ante and Sivry, in 1967.

Sites and monuments
 Boncourt Château, birthplace of Adelbert von Chamisso, the German poet and botanist, was demolished in 1792.

See also
Communes of the Marne department

References

Sivryante